Ábrego is a Spanish surname. Notable people with the surname include:

 Anyolí Ábrego (born 1987), Panamian model
 Cris Abrego, American television producer and businessman
 Francisco de Abrego (d. 1574), Roman Catholic bishop
 Gabriel Martínez-Ábrego (born 1998), Mexican motorcycle racer
 Gaspar Flores de Abrego (1781–1836), American politician
 Johnny Abrego (born 1962), American baseball player
 Jorge Abrego (born 1964), Salvadoran football player
 Joshua Abrego (born 1986), Mexican football player
 Juan García Ábrego (born 1944), Mexican drug lord
 Mercedes Abrego (d. 1813), Colombian revolutionary

References